The Hatton Locks or Hatton Flight are a flight of 21 locks on the Grand Union Canal in Hatton, Warwickshire, England.

History 
The flight was opened in December 1799 on the Warwick and Birmingham Canal.  In 1929, the canal was renamed as the Grand Union Canal (on unification of a number of operators) and the decision was made to widen the Hatton stretch.  In order to accommodate traders with heavy cargos of coal, sugar, tea and spices up the flight, the locks were widened to  – allowing navigation by industrial boats or two single narrowboats.  The widening was completed in the mid-1930s using a workforce of 1,000, and the revolutionary concrete lock system was opened by Prince George, Duke of Kent.

The flight was known as the "stairway to heaven" due to the difficulty of the flight and the subsequent easier journey to Camp Hill where the workmen would receive their wages.

References 
  

Lock flights of England
Transport in Warwickshire